The 1985 CONCACAF U-16 Championship was the second tournament in the Under-16 category organized by the CONCACAF, and it also served as qualifying tournament for the U-16 world cup to be held at China. Mexico hosted the event between April 13 and 26, and Mexico (as champion) and Costa Rica (as runner-up) won the two spots for China 1985.

Competition format
The first stage consisted of two groups, one with five teams and another with four teams, where top two advance to semifinals. In the second round, the champion and runner-up obtain final spots for China 1985.

First stage

Group A

Group B

Second stage

Mexico and Costa Rica qualified to the 1985 FIFA U-16 World Championship in China.  

USA also qualified by way of winning the 1983 CONCACAF U-17 Championship

References

External links
 Official site.

1985
U-17
1985
1984–85 in Costa Rican football
1984–85 in Mexican football
1984–85 in Honduran football
1984–85 in Salvadoran football
1984–85 in Guatemalan football
1985 in American soccer
1985 in Canadian soccer
1985 in youth association football